The 2016–17 Regional Four Day Competition was the 51st edition of the Regional Four Day Competition, the domestic first-class cricket competition for the countries of the West Indies Cricket Board (WICB). The competition ran from 11 November 2016 to 24 April 2017. The WCIB re-introduced day/night fixtures into the competition with six matches played as such.

Six teams contested the tournament – Barbados, Guyana, Jamaica, the Leeward Islands, Trinidad and Tobago, and the Windward Islands. Guyana won the competition, their third consecutive title, after beating the Windward Islands in their penultimate match.

Points table

 Champions

Fixtures

Round 1

Round 2

Round 3

Round 4

Round 5

Round 6

Round 7

Round 8

Round 9

Round 10

References

External links
 Series home at ESPNcricinfo

2016 in West Indian cricket
2017 in West Indian cricket
Regional Four Day Competition seasons
Regional Four Day Competition